Tadeusz Wojtas (born 8 February 1955) is a Polish former cyclist. He competed in the individual road race event at the 1980 Summer Olympics.

References

External links
 

1955 births
Living people
Polish male cyclists
Olympic cyclists of Poland
Cyclists at the 1980 Summer Olympics
People from Gdańsk County
Sportspeople from Pomeranian Voivodeship